The Mohocks were allegedly a gang of violent, well-born criminals that terrorized London in the early 18th century, attacking men and women alike. Taking their name from the Mohawks, they were said to kill or disfigure their male victims and sexually assault their female victims. The matter came to a head in 1712 when a bounty of £100 was issued by the royal court for their capture.

According to Lady Wentworth, "They put an old woman into a hogshead, and rolled her down a hill; they cut off some noses, others' hands, and several barbarous tricks, without any provocation. They are said to be young gentlemen; they never take any money from any." (Wentworth Papers, 277)

Historians have found little evidence of any organized gang, though in spring 1712 there was a flurry of print accounts of the Mohocks, their lawlessness, impunity and luridly violent acts. In response there was also some derision from satirists at what they perceived to be sensationalism by the Grub Street press. John Gay's first drama, The Mohocks, was written that year but was not performed for political reasons. It was, however, published as a pseudonymous pamphlet.

In 18th century London, Mohawks was subsequently applied to other upper-class drunken rowdies and bravos. William Hickey recalled "In the winter of 1771, a set of wild young men made their appearance, who, from the profligacy of their manners and their outrageous conduct in the theatres, taverns, and coffee houses in the vicinity of Covent Garden, created general indignation and alarm.... They were distinguished under the title of Mohawks." Hickey identified their leader as Rhoan Hamilton, "a man of fortune" and later an Irish rebel, and Messrs Hayter, son of a bank director, Osborne, an American, and "Capt." Frederick.
  
Various other gangs of street bullies are alleged to have terrorized London at different periods, beginning in the 1590s with the Damned Crew and continuing after the Restoration with the Muns, the Tityré Tūs, the Hectors, the Scourers, the Nickers, and the Hawkubites.

Further reading 

Meshon Cantrill, "Who has not trembled at the Mohocks' name?" Narratives of Control and Resistance in the Press in Early Eighteenth-Century London University of Saskatchewan 2011, (Thesis)

References 
Jonathan Swift "Journal to Stella", 1712, March 9

Crime in London
Former gangs in London
18th century in London
London street gangs